US Coast Guard Air Station Sector Field Office Port Angeles   is located at the end of the Ediz Hook  peninsula in Port Angeles, Washington.

History
The Coast Guard's presence in Port Angeles began on August 1, 1862 with the arrival of the SHUBRICK, the first Revenue Cutter to be home ported on the Olympic Peninsula.  Ediz Hook, a level sand spit extending from the mainland north and east into the Strait of Juan de Fuca, was declared a Federal Lighthouse Reservation by President Lincoln in 1863.  The first lighthouse was commissioned on 1 April 1865.  The Air Station was commissioned on 1 June 1935, becoming the first permanent Coast Guard Air Station on the Pacific Coast.  Its location was chosen for its strategic position for coastal defense of the Northwest.  The first aircraft, a Douglas RD-4 amphibian, arrived 11 June 1935 and flew the first "mercy hop" on August 1935.  The 75-foot patrol boats were also stationed at the new unit.

During World War II, the Air Station expanded to include a gunnery school, training aerial gunners and local defense forces.  A short runway was added to train Navy pilots for carrier landings.  It also hosted independent units such as Naval Intelligence and was Headquarters of the Air Sea Rescue System for the Northwest Sea Frontier Area.  By the end of 1944, the Air Station had 29 aircraft assigned.

In September 1944 the station officially became Coast Guard Group Port Angeles, with several sub-units including the Air Station, Station Bellingham, Station Neah Bay, Station Port Angeles, Station Quillayute River, USCGC ADELIE, USCGC BLUE SHARK, USCGC CUTTYHUNK, USCGC OSPREY, USCGC SEA LION, USCGC SWORDFISH, USCGC TERRAPIN, and USCGC WAHOO.

In 1946, the first helicopter, a Sikorsky HO3S-1G arrived. This was replaced in 1951 with the Sikorsky HO4S helicopter (the "Eggbeater").  The last fixed wing aircraft, the Grumman HU-16E Albatross (the "Goat") was retired in 1973.  Since then the Air Station has been home to helicopters only, starting with the HH-52A Seaguard, first acquired in 1965.  The HH-52A was replaced in 1988 with the new American Eurocopter HH-65A Dolphin twin turbine helicopter.  During a typical year, Group Port Angeles units carry out over 400 search and rescue missions, saving 35 lives and assisting 500 persons.  Each year, property valued at over $2 million is saved. On 30 JUL 2010, Group/Air Station Port Angeles was reorganized into Air Station / Sector Field Office Port Angeles.  The Sector Field Office logistically supports Station Neah Bay, Station Port Angeles, Station Quillayute River, USCGC ADELIE, USCGC CUTTYHUNK, USCGC OSPREY, USCGC SWORDFISH, and USCGC WAHOO.

Operational area

Air Station Port Angeles is the US Coast Guard's oldest operational air station, in operation since 1935 and today supports three MH-65D Dolphin helicopters, which have been operating at the station since 1984. This air station is well placed as Port Angeles is a port city with ferries to Canada.

Its general operational area is the central and eastern parts of the Strait of Juan de Fuca, from Pillar Point to the south of Whidbey Island. 18 miles to the north is British Columbia and the city of Victoria.

The main roles of the station is search and rescue, maritime law enforcement, waterway security, boating and fishery safety and environmental protection. The station also works in conjunction with Coast Guard Sector Puget Sound, as well as local, state and federal law enforcement agencies of Jefferson and Clallam counties.

Housing
At Coast Guard Air Station Port Angeles there are no housing facilities available for crew and officers, so renting accommodation in Port Angeles is the only option.

References

External links
Coast Guard Air Station Port Angeles Official Site
 http://www.airnav.com/airport/KNOW Information about airfield at Coast Guard Air Station Port Angeles

Buildings and structures in Clallam County, Washington
Port Angeles, Washington
United States Coast Guard Air Stations
Transportation buildings and structures in Clallam County, Washington
1935 establishments in Washington (state)